Mike Scott is the bassist of Phinius Gage and vocalist from Lay It On The Line. He had released three solo acoustic folk punk albums and writes for long running punk zine Punktastic. He has also been in Brighton Pop Punks River Jumpers and UK82 punks Anti-Establishment.

He actively promotes animal rights and is vegan.

Scott played his first solo show in 2007, after five years as bassist for Phinius Gage. He recorded a split 7-inch with Kevin Seconds of 7 Seconds and has recorded three solo albums.

Since January 2012, Scott has also performed vocals in hardcore punk band Lay it on the Line and this has become his main project. The band are notable for their choice of subjects -  releases are concepts based on murders and deaths of the 19th, 20th and 21st centuries - including the murder of Scott's friend Ben Gardner in 2009, which is the subject of the band's song "Therapia Lane". They (and Mike in particular) have regularly chosen the Process Church of the Final Judgment as subject matter in the songs, too, including 2015 EP "A Prelude To The Process".

Academia 
In addition to his musical endeavours, Scott is also a published historian; with his piece "The Spartan Legacy in the contemporary Popular Culture; A case study of the 300" being published in the Journal of Ancient Spartan and Greek History.

Podcast 
Scott is a regular presenter on the Crystal Palace F.C. supporters' podcast, 'Back Of the Nest'.

Discography

Solo

with Phinius Gage

with Lay it on the Line

References

External links 
Review of Mike Scott/Kevin Seconds split 7″ from national website Punktastic
Mike Scott cover of Propagandhi’s ‘Haille Sellasse, Up Your Ass’ played on BBC Radio 1's Lock Up Punk Show
Mike Scott Last.Fm page
Lay It On The Line Bandcamp
Lay It On The Line '120 Days' Video - From 'The Black Museum', 2017
Mike Waldner-Scott "The Spartan Legacy In The Contemporary Popular Culture"

English bass guitarists
English male guitarists
Male bass guitarists
English songwriters
Living people
Underground punk scene in the United Kingdom
Year of birth missing (living people)
Place of birth missing (living people)
British male songwriters